Gizama is a genus of moths of the family Erebidae. The genus was erected by Francis Walker in 1859.

Species
Gizama bronsonalis Schaus, 1916 Costa Rica
Gizama cucullalis Dognin, 1914 Ecuador
Gizama midasalis Walker, [1859] Venezuela
Gizama undilinealis Schaus, 1916 Mexico

References

Hypeninae